Enfield London Borough Council in London, England is elected every four years. Since the last boundary changes in 2002, 63 councillors have been elected from 21 wards.

Political control
Since 1964 political control of the council has been held by the following parties:

Leadership
The leaders of the council since 1965 have been:

Council elections
 1964 Enfield London Borough Council election
 1968 Enfield London Borough Council election
 1971 Enfield London Borough Council election
 1974 Enfield London Borough Council election
 1978 Enfield London Borough Council election
 1982 Enfield London Borough Council election (boundary changes increased the number of seats by six)
 1986 Enfield London Borough Council election
 1990 Enfield London Borough Council election
 1994 Enfield London Borough Council election (boundary changes took place but the number of seats remained the same)
 1998 Enfield London Borough Council election
 2002 Enfield London Borough Council election (boundary changes reduced the number of seats by three) 
 2006 Enfield London Borough Council election
 2010 Enfield London Borough Council election
 2014 Enfield London Borough Council election
 2018 Enfield London Borough Council election

Borough result maps

By-election results

1964-1968
There were no by-elections.

1968-1971

1971-1974

1974-1978

1978-1982

1982-1986

1986-1990

1990-1994

The by-election was called following the death of Cllr. Vladimir C. Goddard.

The by-election was called following the death of Cllr. Roger D. Brooke.

The by-election was called following the resignation of Cllr. James E. Porter.

1994-1998

The by-election was called following the death of Cllr. Patrick R. Horridge.

The by-election was called following the death of Cllr. Leonard V. Nicholls.

The by-election was called following the resignation of Cllr. David J. Mason.

The by-election was called following the resignation of Cllrs. William C. Chapman and Mark Evans.

1998-2002

The by-election was called following the resignation of Cllr. Ian H. Borkett.

The by-election was called following the death of Cllr. Peggy Ford.

2002-2006

The by-election was called following the resignation of Cllr. Alasdair C. M. Macphail.

The by-election was called following the resignation of Cllr. Gerard M. McAllister.

2006-2010

The by-election was called following the resignation of Cllr. Margaret R. Holt.

The by-election was called following the death of Cllr. John W. E. Jackson.

The by-election was called following the death of Cllr. Christopher Andrew.

2010-2014

The by-election was called following the resignation of Cllr. Eleftherios Savva.

2014-2018

The by-election was called following the resignation of Cllr Rohini Simbodyal of Labour. It was held on 7 May 2015, concurrent with the UK general election.

The by-election was called following the resignation of Cllr Ozzie Uzoanya of Labour.

The by-election was called following the death of Cllr Turgut Esendagli of Labour.

2018-2022

References

 By-election results

External links
 Enfield Council